The Duel (French:Le duel) is a 1927 French silent film directed by Jacques de Baroncelli and starring Mady Christians, Gabriel Gabrio and Jean Murat.

Cast
 Mady Christians 
 Gabriel Gabrio as Debreole  
 Jean Murat 
 Andrée Standart
 Georges Despaux
 Janine Borelli
 Lucienne Parizet
 Jane Thierry
 Sarah Clèves 
 Henri Rudaux
 Marcel Doret

References

Bibliography
 Goble, Alan. The Complete Index to Literary Sources in Film. Walter de Gruyter, 1999.

External links

1927 films
Films directed by Jacques de Baroncelli
French silent feature films
1927 drama films
French drama films
French black-and-white films
Silent drama films
1920s French films
1920s French-language films